The Infinite Wave Memorial is a permanent memorial located in Cannon Hill Park, Birmingham dedicated to the 31 British victims of the 2015 Sousse and Bardo terrorist attacks. Commissioned by the Foreign and Commonwealth Office, it was designed by George King Architects and opened in March 2019 by the Duke of Sussex.

The memorial is formed of 31 separate metal streams, representing each of the victims of the attacks, which loop back on one another, forming one single wave. The sculpture took four months to complete and was fabricated from 316 stainless steel tubes. The names of the victims are inscribed on the streams and placed inside each stream are written messages to the victims from their friends and families.

References 

Steel sculptures in England
Sculptures in Birmingham, West Midlands
Outdoor sculptures in England
2019 establishments in England
2019 sculptures